The first season of Man v. Food, an American food reality television series hosted by Adam Richman on the Travel Channel, premiered on December 3, 2008. The series debuted with back-to-back new episodes airing for the first two weeks then settling down to a pattern of one new episode followed by one repeat episode. First-run episodes of the series aired in the United States on the Travel Channel on Wednesdays at 10:00 PM Eastern time. Man v. Food was executive produced by Matt Sharp, in association with the Travel Channel. The season contains 18 episodes and concluded airing on March 25, 2009.

Man v. Food is hosted by actor and food enthusiast Adam Richman. In each episode, Richman explores the "big food" of a different American city before facing off against a pre-existing eating challenge at a local restaurant. Over the course of the first season, the final record wound up at 11 wins for "Man" and 7 wins for "Food".

Reception

Ratings
The first season of Man v. Food was initially picked up for 10 episodes and then, after initial ratings success, an additional 8 episodes were ordered.  The Los Angeles Times noted that the Travel Channel received its highest-ever ratings for a new debut with Man v. Food. They highlighted the show as an example of other networks moving in on the traditional turf of the Food Network.

Critical reaction
CityPages Minneapolis/St. Paul describes the show, "...like the food version of Jackass, with host Adam Richman as its very own Steve-O". In the Star-Ledger, television critic Alan Sepinwall wrote: "It ain't deep, and it certainly ain't healthy (I could feel my arteries clog just from watching), but it's fun". Features reporter Thomas Rozwadowski of the Green Bay Press-Gazette said that "playfully eager host Adam Richman has won me over" and that "it's all in good fun".

Episodes

References

External links
Man v. Food official website

2008 American television seasons
2009 American television seasons
Man v. Food